Bolshiye Doldy is a rural locality (a selo) in Cherdynsky District, Perm Krai, Russia. The population was 150 as of 2010. There are 4 streets.

Geography 
Bolshiye Doldy is located 142 km southwest of Cherdyn (the district's administrative centre) by road. Malye Doldy is the nearest rural locality.

References 

Rural localities in Cherdynsky District